Roger Tilton (1924-2011) was an American filmmaker and documentarian. Tilton has been recognized as a pioneer in the development of IMAX large screen film format due to his work in the Omnimax format in the 1970s and 1980s.

Background 
Roger Tilton was born in East St. Louis in 1924. During World War II, Tilton served as a combat merchant marine in the U.S. Navy. He received a Bachelor of Arts from Stanford University, a Master of Arts from Columbia University, and a Master of Fine Arts from the University of Iowa. In the 1950s, Tilton taught film at Columbia University and the City College of New York.

Career 
In the 1950s, Roger Tilton founded a film company named Roger Tilton Films, Inc. Roger Tilton was an innovator in the development of Omnimax film technology. In 1968, Tilton was awarded at the Atlanta Film Festival. In addition to his work in cinema, Tilton also directed advertisements for television.

Jazz Dance 
In his 1954 film Jazz Dance, Tilton attempted to illustrate jazz music through film. In 2002, David Butler wrote that Tilton conceived Jazz Dance "as a response to the fact that 'so many films on jazz have been phony, plaster-of-Paris glamorizations of jazz. What is needed is a film which will let people experience real jazz.'" The soundtrack to the film features American jazz musicians Willie "The Lion" Smith, Pee Wee Russell, and Pops Foster.

Pilots North 

Tilton's 1981 documentary Pilots North discusses bush pilots in the Canadian North. Following its release, the Edmonton Journal wrote that Pilots North "recalls a bold era" with "breath-taking photography." The Edmonton Journal also celebrated the film for depicting how "pilot navigators challenged the elements to supply and service the inhabitants of the [Canadian] North and open the way for present aerial routes linking Eastern and Western Canada with the North and Far South." Pilots North was narrated by Lanny Lee Hagen and Canadian aviator Stanley Ransom McMillan worked as a technical advisor for the film. The score to the film was written by Canadian composer Tommy Banks.

Spiker 

Tilton's 1985 feature film Spiker was a sports drama film centered on the United States Olympic volleyball team at the 1984 Summer Olympics.

Personal life 
Roger Tilton was married to Pat Tilton. Roger Tilton passed away on 22 May 2011.

Filmography

See also 
 OmniMax

References

External links 

 
 Roger Tilton obituary

1924 births
People from East St. Louis, Illinois
American documentary film directors
American_documentary_film_producers
2011 deaths
United States Merchant Mariners of World War II
Stanford University alumni
Columbia University alumni
University of Iowa alumni
Columbia University faculty
City College of New York faculty